Tantangan, officially the Municipality of Tantangan (Jawi: ايڠايد نو تنتاڠن), is a 3rd class municipality in the province of South Cotabato, Philippines. According to the 2020 census, it has a population of 45,744 people.

Geography

Barangays
Tantangan is politically subdivided into 13 barangays.
 Bukay Pait
 Cabuling
 Dumadalig
 Libas
 Magon Baguiland
 Maibo
 Mangilala
 New Cuyapo
 New Iloilo
 New Lambunao
 Poblacion
 San Felipe
 Tinongcop

Climate

Demographics

Economy

References

External links
 Tantangan Profile at PhilAtlas.com
 Tantangan Profile at the DTI Cities and Municipalities Competitive Index
 [ Philippine Standard Geographic Code]
Philippine Census Information

Municipalities of South Cotabato